Initiative 82 was a voter-approved ballot initiative in Washington, D.C., to phase out the special minimum wage for tipped employees as part of the national Fight for $15 campaign. In the November 2022 general election, D.C. voters approved Initiative 82 by a margin of 74% to 26%, though about 12% of all participating voters did not vote on the initiative. It was nearly identical to Initiative 77, a ballot measure in the 2018 primary election that was approved by D.C. voters but later overturned by the D.C. Council before it could enter into force.  

Initiative 82 passed its 30-day legislative review period and became law on February 23, 2023, however on January 17, 2023, the DC Council voted to delay the first pay increase until May 1, 2023.

Background
On Monday, June 22, 2021, Ryan O'Leary, a former restaurant worker, submitted the legislative text for the Full Minimum Wage for Tipped Workers Amendment Act at the DC Board of Elections with the goal of the Initiative to appearing on the June 2022 Primary election ballot.  On Thursday, August 26, 2021, the DC Board of Elections conducted their "subject matter" hearing and voted that the Initiative could go forward and begin the ballot access phase.  On Wednesday, October 13, 2021, at the regular meeting of the DC Board of Elections, the Board approved the revised short title and summary statement, and the petition form for Initiative 82, now known as the District of Columbia Tip Credit Elimination Act 2021.

Initiative 82 would gradually increase the tipped minimum hourly wage from the  $5.05 in 2021 to at least $17.00, matching the non-tipped minimum wage in 2027. Although some DC restaurants voluntarily have stopped accepting tips and instead have begun paying their servers at or above minimum wage in the aftermath of Initiative 77, tipping would still be allowed under the new rules.

Although the DC Board of Elections approved the Initiative to appear on the ballot, opponents argued that the Board committed errors in verifying signatures and filed a lawsuit in D.C. Superior Court to keep the measure off the ballot. The opponents ultimately lost their original lawsuit and appeals in early September, 2022, allowing the Initiative to appear on the ballot.

Political arguments

Support and opposition

The campaign committee behind the Initiative was the D.C. Committee to Build A Better Restaurant Industry, which raised $461,854.65 in donations, which were mostly used for collecting sufficient signatures to appear on the ballot.  The largest contributions to the campaign were from Open Society Policy Center, Dr. Bronner's Magic Soaps, and Mintwood Strategies.

The campaign committee against the initiative was called No to 82 and was run out of the K Street office of the Restaurant Association of Metropolitan Washington.  The opposition campaign received $685,622.70 in contributions from the National Restaurant Association, Darden Restaurants, Starr Restaurants, Lettuce Entertain You Enterprises, Brinker International, Farmers Restaurant Group, as well as other trade groups, and a number of restaurants located in DC.

Although Initiative 77 was overruled by the Council, the Washington City Paper reported that, due to changes in membership, a majority of members said they would not vote to overturn it, so "Initiative 82 looks safe should voters approve it in November".  However, before the Initiative completed its congressional review period, the DC Council voted to delay the first pay raise until May 1, 2023.

Pay Raises
The District of Columbia's Fair Shot Minimum Wage Emergency Amendment Act of 2016 gradually increased both the standard and tipped minimum wages each July until July 2020, when they eventually equaled $15 and $5, respectively. Each year since, the minimum wages have increased in proportion to any increases in the local consumer price index.

Beginning on May 1, 2023, the first pay raise for tipped workers will go into effect. The second tipped minimum wage increase will take place two months later on July 1, 2023, and gradually increase annually until the tipped minimum wage equals the prevailing minimum wage on July 1, 2027.  

Due to the variability of the consumer price index, the exact annual minimum wage increases cannot be known for 2024 through 2027. However, the minimum wage is not scheduled to decrease, so the information listed in the table below is based on the latest information from the Office of Wage-Hour Compliance  and the legislative text of the Initiative.

On July 1, 2027, the tipped wage will be eliminated in the District of Columbia and there will be one minimum wage for all workers. The exact minimum wage will not be known until January 2027.

Vote
Initiative 82, officially presented as the "District of Columbia Tip Credit Elimination Act of 2021," had the following description on ballots:Under current law, employers of employees classified as “tipped workers” may take a credit against tipped wages received by workers to satisfy the minimum wage guaranteed to all workers by law. If enacted, the Initiative would gradually eliminate the credit, such that the mandatory base wage (currently $5.05 per hour, indexed to inflation) paid by employers shall increase until 2027, when the mandatory base wage matches the minimum wage established by District of Columbia law (currently $15.20 per hour, indexed to inflation). Tips continue as property of employees and will be in addition to the statutory minimum hourly wage.

On November 8, 2022, in the general election, D.C. voters approved the measure with 73.94% of valid votes, a margin of nearly 50%. Over 25,000 voters, more than 12% of all voters that participated, chose to leave the question blank.

See also
Minimum wage in the United States
Tipped wage
List of Washington, D.C. ballot measures

References

2022 in Washington, D.C.
Politics of Washington, D.C.
2022 ballot measures